{{DISPLAYTITLE:NZR WA class }}

The NZR WA class locomotives were a class of Tank locomotive built by New Zealand Railways (NZR). Eleven were built at NZR's own Addington Workshops in Christchurch and Hillside Workshops in Dunedin. Four more were converted from old J class 2-6-0 locomotives.

Three were fitted with brakes to assist descent on the Fell-operated Rewanui and Roa inclines on the South Island's West Coast Region. These were among the last in use.

Preservation 
Only one WA class has been preserved, number 165. The locomotive was restored by Gisborne City Vintage Railway in 2000.

See also
 NZR W class
 NZR WB class
 NZR WD class
 NZR WE class
 NZR WF class
 NZR WG class
 NZR WW class
 NZR WS / WAB class
 Locomotives of New Zealand

References

Citations

Bibliography

 
 

2-6-2T locomotives
W class
3 ft 6 in gauge locomotives of New Zealand
Railway locomotives introduced in 1892